McIntyre is a Scottish and Irish surname. 

McIntyre may also refer to:

Places
 McIntyre, Ontario (disambiguation), Canada, multiple locations
 McIntyre, Georgia, United States
 McIntyre, Ohio, United States
 McIntyre Township, Pennsylvania, United States
 Mount McIntyre, Antarctica

Other
 Clan MacIntyre, a Scottish clan
 McIntyre Automobile, early 20th century US automobile brand
 McIntyre Ski Area, a ski resort in New Hampshire

See also
 McIntire
 MacIntyre